Triepeolus rufithorax is a species of cuckoo bee in the family Apidae. It is found in North America.

References

 Rightmyer, Molly G. (2008). "A review of the cleptoparasitic bee genus Triepeolus (Hymenoptera: Apidae). Part I".

Further reading

 

Nomadinae
Insects described in 1928